CEDU Educational Services, Inc., known simply as CEDU (pronounced see-doo), was a company founded in 1967 by Mel Wasserman. The company owned and operated several therapeutic boarding schools licensed as group homes, wilderness therapy programs, and behavior modification programs in California and Idaho. The company's schools have faced numerous allegations of abuse. CEDU originated from Synanon, a group that has been called one of the "most dangerous and violent cults America had ever seen."

Origins 
CEDU originates from Synanon, a cult founded in Santa Monica, California in 1958 by Charles E. Dederich. According to an account in Santa Monica's Evening Outlook of January 23, 1959 in an article by R. D. Fox, Synanon stands for "Sins Anonymous". However, Synanon was incorporated in 1958 as a nonprofit foundation after a person struggling with substance abuse stumbled over the words "seminar" and "symposium", the mostly commonly accepted origin of the word. According to Maia Szalavitz, author of Help at Any Cost: How the Troubled-Teen Industry Cons Parents and Hurts Kids, "Synanon sold itself as a cure for hardcore heroin addicts who could help each other by 'breaking' new initiates with isolation, humiliation, hard labor, and sleep deprivation."
The troubled teen industry has continued to be associated with Synanon and the various CEDU spin-offs. Former students have made the assertion that CEDU was an acronym for Charles E. Dederich University,  while CEDU marketing materials claim this stood for "See Yourself As You Are and Do Something About It".

Program
The average time a child spent at a CEDU program before graduating was  years. Teenagers where often held beyond their 18th birthday with conservatorship or extended custody, until they completed the full program.  The programs were year-round. CEDU had its own language, derived from Synanon. Three times a week, for 3-4 hours, teenagers would attend "raps," pseudo psychology group sessions led by untrained staff based on Synanon's "the game." Children and staff were incentivized to "indict" residents for minor rule infractions, previous traumas, and "disclosures" or items individuals were ashamed of, in the name of emotional growth. This is commonly referred to as attack therapy, where screaming, swearing, and humiliation is appropriate and expected. Group touching, called "smooshing", consisted of hand holding, spooning, snuggling, caressing, sitting on laps, petting hair, was expected of both teenagers and staff. It was common for staff to engage in this form of touch with teenagers.

In addition to raps, in order to advance in the CEDU program, a resident would have to earn the  privilege to participate in a workshop known as a "" every three months. The  were based on Synanon's "trip", and would last from 24 hours to several days at a time. The  were led by unlicensed staff along with teenagers at an advanced stage of the program, known as "upper school". They employed sleep-deprivation, humiliation, exposure to large variations in temperature, guided imagery, loud and repetitive music, regression therapy, physical reenactments of trauma, and forced emoting. The propheets were based on the book The Prophet  by Kahlil Gibran, writings of R.W. Emerson, and Thoreau. Each used "tools" from the historic literature, that were later used as stepping stones in the program that teenagers were expected to act upon in every day life. There were seven propheets (Truth, Children’s, Brother’s Keeper, Dreams, I Want To Live, Values, and Imagine), and two workshops (I and Me, and Summit)

During intake, which occurred upon a teenager's arrival to a CEDU program, they were strip searched by staff and upper school residents, were placed in generic clothing after their belongings where taken away, and made to sign a contract consenting to CEDU's agreements. The three most emphasized agreements were no sex, no drugs, and no violence, yet there were agreements for every part of life, including timed showers, the way hair was worn, and the way people must speak. Violators would be sent to the Ascent Wilderness Program located in Ruby Ridge, Idaho, which was CEDU's version of a six-week boot camp, or placed on a "restriction", which included emotional growth writing assignments, manual labor, isolation, "bans" or forbidding a teenager to speak to, look at, or be acknowledged by peers, and sometimes "bans" from singing, smiling, reading, learning, drawing, and being touched.

History

Original CEDU period (1967–1985)

In 1969 CEDU bought a town house in San Bernardino and was also operating a gasoline station in Loma Linda. Contemporaneous newspaper reporting cited allegations of "sex orgies" and "brainwashing", claims that were at the time rebutted at length by CEDU. Cedu was later accused of informing problematic students of the option of transferring them to the California Youth Authority, Juvenile Hall or Patton state hospital.

The original CEDU program did not believe in the use of medicine.

Expansion (1982–1990)
In 1982, a small group of staff and residents known as the "original seven" left the Running Springs, California campus for Bonners Ferry, Idaho, to open Rocky Mountain Academy (RMA). RMA's curriculum and philosophy were identical to the original school, CEDU Running Springs. In 1989, CEDU expanded tuition sources to allow payment from school districts and insurance companies, and started an endowment fund to allow scholarships. On rare occasions, staff and students were transferred between schools. The staff generally transferred campuses for promotions, while students were transferred because the staff felt a "fresh start" was the best (and usually last) option for the student. Rocky Mountain Academy was one of the largest employers in Boundary County, Idaho during the period, diversifying its timber and agriculture economy. In 1992, CEDU expanded with the opening of three programs: CEDU Middle School, a program for 9.5-13.5 year-olds on the CEDU Running Springs, CA, campus; Ascent, a 41-day wilderness camp in Ruby Ridge, Idaho, where many children were sent prior to enrollment before a second CEDU program, and CEDU Education, which provided teen transport services to all CEDU programs and safe housing, as well as in home enrollment.

CEDU Education - Brown Schools (1998–2005)
CEDU Education was sold to Brown Schools in 1998.

Closure
Brown Schools operated 11 boarding schools and educational facilities in California, Idaho, Texas, Vermont, and Florida. Upon closure, several CEDU employees reported to Lake Arrowhead Mountain News that pending litigation against CEDU for abuse and violation of rights as well as citations against the schools contributed to the downfall. In March 2005, Brown Schools declared bankruptcy. The same year, Universal Health Services bid $13.5 million for the Brown School properties in bankruptcy.

Idaho Educational Services
Universal Health Services Inc., a public company focused on hospitals and behavioral health centers, subsequently reopened three of the former CEDU facilities: Boulder Creek Academy (located on the former Rocky Mountain Academy property), Northwest Academy, and Ascent Wilderness Program, whose name they later changed to Caribou Ridge Intervention. These operate under the new name of Idaho Educational Services. Each program is overseen by individual directors.

In the news 

December 12 1985 - Rescue teams search for five girls who went missing in a snowstorm during a survival course run by CEDU in the Joshua Tree National Park  

July 15, 1994 - A male client from Texas hanged himself with a belt from a pipe of an overhead sprinkler system in one of the dormitories of Lower Camelot at Rocky Mountain Academy in Bonners Ferry, Idaho.

July 28, 1994 - It is revealed that a former CEDU employee and white separatist planned to kidnap students attending Rocky Mountain Academy for ransom, including the children of celebrities Barbara Walters and Clint Eastwood. The employee, who was a friend of Randy Weaver, was fired after federal agents discovered the plot.

June 27, 1996 - John C. D'Abreo files a lawsuit against CEDU in Monterey County, claiming he was physically and emotionally abused at Ascent and Northwest Academy.

November 1996 - Former Rocky Mountain Academy staff and owner of Boundarylines Crisis Intervention Richard "Rowdy" Armstrong is accused of drugging, raping and sodomizing former Rocky Mountain Academy staff and Boundarylines Crisis Intervention co-worker Twila Stephenson.

January 1997 - Five people are injured in a riot at Northwest Academy in Ruby Ridge, Idaho.

March 31, 1998 - Marsha and Ronald Accomazzo file a lawsuit against CEDU. Their son was enrolled at Ascent and Rocky Mountain Academy, and injured in the Northwest Academy riot.

March 31, 1998 - Nancy Dark makes allegations leading to charges against CEDU. Her son was enrolled at Boulder Creek Academy, Ascent, and the Northwest Academy, and injured in the Northwest Academy riot.

April 1, 1998 - CEDU is sued for fraud, racketeering, and battery.

April 5, 2000 - Dianne and Robert Reibstein file a lawsuit against CEDU for neglect and abuse. Their son was at Ascent and Rocky Mountain Academy.

October 13, 2002 - An article titled "When Rich Kids Go Bad" is published by Forbes magazine. Leigh Horowitz, along with several other anonymous CEDU clients, are interviewed.

January 14, 2004 - An article about Boulder Creek Academy titled "The Last Resort" is published by the Chicago Tribune. Several CEDU clients and parents are interviewed.

May 26, 2020 - Adam Eget, an actor and comedian known for his work with Norm Macdonald, talks about his experiences with CEDU on The Joe Rogan Experience podcast. Eget describes CEDU as an abusive cult, and talks about multiple examples of child endangerment he saw as a client attending a CEDU School.

September 14, 2020 - This Is Paris, a documentary that covers the time Paris Hilton spent at CEDU School, Ascent Wilderness Program, Cascade School, and Provo Canyon School, premieres on YouTube.

January 17, 2021 - The Los Angeles Times publishes an article where CEDU client Rachel Uchitel describes allegedly having to dig a grave with a spoon and then being forced to lay in it.

April 23, 2022 - Rich & Shameless kicks off episode one of their first season with an exposé on Girls Gone Wild founder Joe Francis. Dead, Insane, or in Jail  author Zack Bonnie is interviewed about the time they spent together at Rocky Mountain Academy in the late 1980s.
 

October 31, 2022 - Los Angeles Magazine published the article “Why Are Police Stifling the Investigation Into 3 Teens Who Vanished From a Controversial Residential Treatment Facility?” The article addresses the disappearance of John Inman, Blake Pursley, and Daniel Yuen who vanished from CEDU School’s campus in Running Springs, California in 1993, 1994, and 2004.

March 1, 2023 - Los Angeles Magazine published the article “Suspect No. 1: Inside Daniel Yuen’s Missing Person Case,” which does a deep dive into his disappearance from CEDU School’s campus in Running Springs, California on February 8, 2004. 

March 14, 2023 - Paris: The Memoir, an autobiography by Paris Hilton that exposes the time she spent trapped in the troubled teen industry including being sent to CEDU School, Ascent Wilderness Program, Cascade School, and Provo Canyon School from the summer of 1997 to January 1999 is published.

See also

Related topics
Continuation high school
Oppositional defiant disorder
Residential education
Residential treatment center
Teenage rebellion
Troubled teen industry
Youth rights

Techniques
Behavior modification
Brainwashing
Operant conditioning
Therapeutic community

Therapies
Attack therapy
Behavior therapy
Group psychotherapy
The Primal Scream

References

External links 
Official website 
Surviving Cedu, a 2008 documentary by Liam Scheff, featuring a closing segment with cult expert Paul Morantz
The Discarded Ones: A Novel Based on a True Story, the definitive 2012 book about life at CEDU. The story is set in 1983 and told through the eyes of a new student
Whiteout, a memoir written in 2018 by Lathrop Lybrook about her experience at Rocky Mountain Academy, Ascent, and North Idaho Behavioral Health from September 30, 1998, to December 13, 1999
Running My Anger: The Legacy of the CEDU Cult, an anonymous account of what it was like to be a student at CEDU in Idaho and California. Medium Anonymous discusses the current documentaries on CEDU, Rocky Mountain Academy, and articles on trauma and how they relate to them as a prior student of CEDU
Dead, Insane, or In Jail: a CEDU Memoir, a memoir by Zack Bonnie, is an account of what it was like to attend the wilderness bootcamp along with Rocky Mountain Academy. This book has been referred to as "the whistleblower" in the troubled teen community.

Therapeutic community
Education companies of the United States
Defunct schools in Idaho
Defunct schools in California
Educational institutions established in 1967
Educational institutions disestablished in 2005
Therapeutic boarding schools in the United States
1967 establishments in the United States
2005 disestablishments in Idaho